Preglovo is a village in the municipality of Plasnica, North Macedonia.

Demographics
Preglovo has traditionally been a Macedonian Muslim (Torbeš) village.

As of the 2021 census, Preglovo had 928 residents with the following ethnic composition:
Turks 916
Persons for whom data are taken from administrative sources 6
Albanians 6

According to the 2002 census, the village had a total of 1,079 inhabitants. Ethnic groups in the village include:
Turks 1,070
Albanians 3
Macedonians 1
Others 5

References

Villages in Plasnica Municipality
Macedonian Muslim villages
Turkish communities in North Macedonia